Fra Antonio da Negroponte was an Italian painter of the early-Renaissance period, active mainly in Padua and Venice. He painted in a Quattrocento style that resembles that of Bartolomeo Vivarini. Among his works are a Madonna and Child Enthroned for a chapel in the church of San Francesco della Vigna in Venice.

References

15th-century Italian painters
Italian male painters
Italian Renaissance painters
Painters from Venice
Year of death unknown
Year of birth unknown